Yes, Indeed! is an album by Tommy Dorsey and his Orchestra, released in 1990 by Bluebird RCA. The album contains recordings of Tommy Dorsey from 1939 to 1945.

Track listing

Personnel
Arranger: Sy Oliver
Clarinetist: Johnny Mince
Composers: Gene Austin, Nat Shilkret, Frances Faye, Dan Howell, Don Raye, Jimmie Lunceford, Sy Oliver, Stephen Foster, Billy Moore, Sherman Myers, Chester Wallace, Irving Berlin, Gus Kahn, Neil Moret
Drums: Buddy Rich
Tenor Saxophonist: Don Lodice
Trombone: Tommy Dorsey
Trumpeter: Ziggy Elman

References

External links
 Yes Indeed! at Discogs.com

1990 compilation albums
Tommy Dorsey albums